Amir Slama is a Brazilian fashion designer. He was the designer, stylist and owner of the Brazilian beach fashion brand Rosa Chá.  He now runs a brand under his name, Amir Slama, with stores in Sao Paulo and Rio de Janeiro.

Amir's father came to Brazil when he was a little over 20 years old to work in the textile business as a trade representative on the 25 de Março street (in the Bom Retiro neighborhood); he later set up his own factory. Before coming to Brazil, his father lived for a few years in Israel, where he met his wife. Amir recalls that his parents spoke in Hebrew between themselves.

Amir was a history professor before establishing his career in the fashion industry; with the help of his wife, he started Rosa Cha. His talent has become known throughout the fashion community with Rosa Cha constantly being editorialized by Vogue, Harper's Bazaar, Elle, W Magazine, Sports Illustrated, Cosmopolitan, and many more.

He became friends with supermodel Naomi Campbell after she visited his shop in Sao Paulo; Campbell has modeled his collections on the runway ever since.

Awards
 Brazil's Best Designer of the Year award in 2002 and 2003

References

External links
 
 Official Amir Slama site
 
 Rosa Cha by Amir Slama Spring 2004

Year of birth missing (living people)
Living people
Brazilian fashion designers
Jewish fashion designers